Henry Zuber III (born June 11, 1966) is an American politician. He is a member of the Mississippi House of Representatives from the 113th District, being first elected in 1999. He is a member of the Republican party.

References

1966 births
Living people
Republican Party members of the Mississippi House of Representatives
21st-century American politicians